Methyl-1-testosterone (M1T; developmental code name SC-11195), also known as 17α-methyl-4,5α-dihydro-δ1-testosterone (17α-methyl-δ1-DHT) or 17α-methyl-5α-androst-1-en-17β-ol-3-one, as well as methyldihydroboldenone, is a synthetic and orally active anabolic–androgenic steroid (AAS) which was never marketed for medical use. It is the 17α-methyl derivative of 1-testosterone (Δ1-DHT; dihydroboldenone).

Methyl-1-testosterone is on the World Anti-Doping Agency's list of prohibited substances, and is therefore banned from use in most major sports.

References

Androgens and anabolic steroids
Androstanes
Hepatotoxins
World Anti-Doping Agency prohibited substances